Malaxis abieticola  is a species of orchid native to Mexico and to the southwestern United States (Arizona, New Mexico). It has only one leaf underneath several small green flowers growing in an elongated array.

References

External links
photo of herbarium specimen at Missouri Botanical Garden, collected in México State in 1890

Flora of Mexico
Flora of the Southwestern United States
Plants described in 1891
abieticola